The 1997 São Paulo F.C. season details the competitions entered, matches played and teams faced by the São Paulo Futebol Clube in the 1997 season, showing the result in each event. Both friendly and official events are included. São Paulo Futebol Clube is a professional football club based in São Paulo, Brazil. They play in the Campeonato Paulista, São Paulo's state league, and the Campeonato Brasileiro Série A or Brasileirão, Brazil's national league.

Statistics

Scorers

Overall

{|class="wikitable"
|-
|Games played || 79 (4 Torneio Rio-São Paulo, 26 Campeonato Paulista, 4 Copa do Brasil, 25 Campeonato Brasileiro, 10 Supercopa Libertadores, 10 Friendly match)
|-
|Games won || 31 (0 Torneio Rio-São Paulo, 12 Campeonato Paulista, 2 Copa do Brasil, 8 Campeonato Brasileiro, 5 Supercopa Libertadores, 4 Friendly match)
|-
|Games drawn || 28 (2 Torneio Rio-São Paulo, 11 Campeonato Paulista, 1 Copa do Brasil, 9 Campeonato Brasileiro, 3 Supercopa Libertadores, 2 Friendly match)
|-
|Games lost || 20 (2 Torneio Rio-São Paulo, 3 Campeonato Paulista, 1 Copa do Brasil, 8 Campeonato Brasileiro, 2 Supercopa Libertadores, 4 Friendly match)
|-
|Goals scored || 145
|-
|Goals conceded || 96
|-
|Goal difference || +49
|-
|Best result || 8–1 (H) v Juventus – Campeonato Paulista – 1997.04.27
|-
|Worst result || 1–3 (H) v Flamengo – Torneio Rio-São Paulo – 1997.02.011–3 (A) v Bahia – Campeonato Brasileiro – 1997.08.171–3 (H) v Vitória – Friendly match – 1997.11.20
|-
|Top scorer || Dodô (54)
|-

Friendlies

Torneo de Club Hermanos

Copa dos Campeões Mundiais

Festival Brasileiro de Futebol

Official competitions

Torneio Rio-São Paulo

Record

Campeonato Paulista

First stage

Matches

Second round

Matches

Record

Copa do Brasil

Round of 32

Eightfinals

Record

Campeonato Brasileiro

First phase

Matches

Record

Supercopa Sudamericana

Record

External links
official website 

Sao Paulo
São Paulo FC seasons